Kenneth Mathiason Skeaping (13 December 185616 May 1946) was an English lithographer, portrait painter and illustrator. His three children who survived to adulthood became leading exponents in early music, sculpture, and ballet.

Biography
Skeaping was born in Liverpool on 13 December 1856 to decorative wood carver Joseph Nairn Skeaping (baptised on 6 August 18291 January 1902) and Mary Pollock Mathiason (baptised on 24 May 183514 March 1917)  Who had married at St. Philip's Church, Liverpool on 10 April 1853.
 
Skeaping was the second of the couple's nine children, and the eldest boy. At least two of his siblings had careers in the arts. His brother John Skeaping (21 May 18594 May 1940) was a figure and landscape painter, and a lithographer. His sister Elizabeth Jane "Lily" (14 September 187031 October 1947 ) was a figure, landscape, and miniature painter. 

It is not clear where Skeaping was educated. His family were close knit, and he initially worked with his mother helping her to make wigs from real hair, before training as a lithographic artist, which is how he recorded his occupation in the 1881 census. He was still registered to vote at his parents' home at 50 Warren StreetHe travelled to London in the early 1880s and met his future wife there in 1886. He  subsequently spent time in Paris adsorbing the art of the impressionists and post-impressionists.

In 1895 he married Sarah Ann Rattenbury (2 January 1867second quarter 1960), the daughter of the late Thomas Swaine Rattenbury (6 June 183022 June 1877), a grocer and cheeses monger of New Cross. and grocer's shopwoman Sarah Rattenbury née Day (c. 183210 October 1898). The couple had four children:
Kenneth Mathiason Skeaping (22 September 189714 October 1977), a musician and a leader and educator in early music.
Sally Skeaping (13 August 18999 January 1916) who died of appendicitis and peritonitis at Guy's Hospital, London aged 16, in the presence of her mother. She was buried near her home at Bexleyheath.
John Rattenbury Skeaping RA (9 June 19015 March 1980),  the noted sculptor.
Mary Emma Skeaping  (15 December 19029 February 1984). the ballet dancer and producer.

The children had an unusual upbringing, apparently being educated entirely at home until their teens. In an interview in 1968, his son John recalls Skeaping as saying: ". . . two great qualities that children have are imagination and the power of imitation so the only things they should do is develop their imagination by learning music, dancing, painting, sculpture, and so forth an imitation - they can learn languages. What is stuffed into children against their will over ten years they can forget in six months. What you learn willingly over that ten years, you never forget."

The eldest child was born in Woodford in Essex in 1897, and their address at the baptism of Sally in December 1899 was Kersal Villa, Malmsbury Road, South Woodford, Essex. They were still there in 1905, but by the time of the 1911 census they were living at Cliftonville, Warren Road, Bexleyheath, London, and were still there in 1918. by 1929 the electoral register shows the family had moved to 2 Eton College Road, in Camden, London. They were still there ten years later at the time of the 1939 Register in September of that year, and in the street directory for 1840. Skeaping had moved to Corners, Cross Road, Tadworth in Surrey by 1945, and was said to have lived there for several years when he died in 1946.

Skeaping died on 16 May 1946. He was 89 years old. His wife survived him by fourteen years, dying at the age of 93.

Work

Painting
The first sale recorded for Skeaping was at the Autumn Exhibition of the Manchester City Art Gallery in 1886 where he sold Reciting the Charge of the Light Brigade for two guineas (£2 2s.). Skeaping exhibited 34 works at the Walker Art Gallery, Liverpool, and two works at the Manchester City Art Gallery. He showed Home Industry at the 1892 Isle of Man International Exhibition. In 1908 he was commissioned to paint a portrait of Lord Byron after an earlier portrait by Thomas Phillips RA, painted during Byron's life. In 1911 he exhibited thee "very delightful figure studies" Queen of the roses, Lily and the lilies, and Gone for ever, at the Spring Exhibition in the Rochdale Art Gallery. The following year he had two "very delightful child studies" For Harvest Festival and Peace on Earth at the gallery's Spring Exhibition. Currently five portraits by Skeaping are at the Rochdale Art Gallery.

Illustration
It is not known to what extent Skeaping illustrated magazines. However, given that he illustrated the Tit-bits monster rhyme book in 1899, suggests he may have been doing illustrations for Tit-bits at least. He only seems to have illustrated a few handfuls of books, but two of these have about 100 illustrations each.

The following list of books was generated by searching the Jisc Library Hub Discover database for books with the keyword "Skeaping" between 1880 and 1950, and then removing books by his brother John Skeaping, his son John Rattenbury Skeaping, his sister-in-law, Emily J. Skeaping, and other irrelevant items.

Notes

References

External links
 

1859 births
1946 deaths
19th-century British painters
20th-century British painters
Artists from Liverpool
English watercolourists
British portrait painters
British male painters
English illustrators
English children's book illustrators
Magazine illustrators
19th-century British male artists
20th-century British male artists